The Last Circus & the Electrocution is a 1980 collection of two short stories by Ray Bradbury.  "The Last Circus" is original to this collection.  "The Electrocution" first appeared in The Californian in 1946 under the pseudonym William Elliot.

Contents
 introduction by William F. Nolan
 "The Last Circus"
 "The Electrocution"
 "Under the Mushroom Tent" (essay)

References

External links
 
 

1980 short story collections
Short story collections by Ray Bradbury